Bomber: A Defense Report on Film is a 1941 American short documentary film produced by the United States Office for Emergency Management, and was edited from the 19-minute Building a Bomber: A Defense Report on Film (1941). The film commentary was written by Carl Sandburg.

The main subject of Bomber: A Defense Report on Film was the Martin B-26 Marauder, a twin-engined medium bomber in production from 1941 to 1945.

Synopsis
Bomber: A Defense Report on Film showed aspects of the assembly of Martin B-26 Marauders at the Glenn L. Martin Company plant in Baltimore, Maryland. The manufacture of the aircraft involves both mechanical assembly as well as work done by hand, such as riveting. The process of building a bomber is seen, from the foundry where molten metals are cooked, to rivets and tools designed specifically for American aircraft production.

The many sub-assemblies that make up the bomber were precisely machined so that the final assembly was eased. After assembly, the B-26s were tested by a small team of two USAAC pilots and a flight engineer, before acceptance by the military.

Reception
Bomber: A Defense Report on Film was typical of the information-based training films of the period produced under the auspices of the Office of War Information. The film was distributed and exhibited by under the auspices of the Motion Picture Committee Cooperating for National Defense; and ends with the "V sign" signifying victory.

Bomber: A Defense Report on Film was nominated for an Academy Award for Best Documentary Short.

The Academy Film Archive preserved Bomber: A Defense Report on Film in 2002.

References

Notes

Citations

Bibliography

 Ethell, L. Jeffrey. Aircraft of World War II.  Glasgow: HarperCollins Publishers, 1995. .
 Johnsen, Frederick A. Martin B-26 Marauder. North Branch, Minnesota: Specialty Press, 2000. .
 Koppes, Clayton R. and Gregory D. Black. Hollywood Goes to War: How Politics, Profits and Propaganda Shaped World War II Movies. New York, The Free Press, 1987. .

External links
 
 

1941 films
1941 documentary films
1941 short films
American World War II propaganda shorts
American documentary films
American black-and-white films
Documentary films about military aviation
Black-and-white documentary films
Films about the United States Army Air Forces
1940s short documentary films
1940s English-language films
1940s American films